Cape Fletcher is a minor projection of the ice-covered Antarctic coastline south of Martin Reef, midway between Strahan Glacier and Scullin Monolith. It was discovered by the British Australian New Zealand Antarctic Research Expedition, 1929–31, under Mawson, and named by him for H.O. Fletcher, assistant biologist with the expedition.

References 

Headlands of Mac. Robertson Land